Marta Olczak (born 19 May 1994 in Warsaw) is a Polish figure skater. She is the 2007 and 2008 Polish novice national champion. She competed internationally on the junior level.

Competitive highlights

 N = Novice level; J = Junior level

External links

 
 Tracings.net profile
  Figureskatingonline.info profile

Polish female single skaters
Figure skaters from Warsaw
1994 births
Living people